Lukáš Greššák (born 23 January 1989) is a Slovak footballer who plays for Sigma Olomouc as a defensive midfielder or a centre back.

Club career
He was signed by Spartak Trnava in August 2014 and made his debut for them against Košice on 24 August 2014.

Honours 
Spartak Trnava
 Slovak Super Liga: 2017–18

References

External links
 
 
 Šport.aktuality profile
 Futbalnet profile
 Eurofotbal profile
 MFK Ružomberok profile 

1989 births
Living people
Slovak footballers
Association football midfielders
MFK Ružomberok players
FC Spartak Trnava players
Zagłębie Sosnowiec players
SK Sigma Olomouc players
Slovak Super Liga players
Ekstraklasa players
Czech First League players
Expatriate footballers in Poland
Expatriate footballers in the Czech Republic
People from Trstená
Sportspeople from the Žilina Region